Dimitrios Chasomeris (born 23 June 1989) is a Greek professional footballer who plays as a forward for Iraklis Larissa.

Career

Iraklis
On 8 August 2018, Chasomeris signed a contract with Iraklis, newly promoted from the 2017–18 Gamma Ethniki, on a free transfer. On 31 October, he scored his first goal for the club in an embarrassing 6–1 home win against Atromitos in the Greek Cup. On 25 November 2018, he scored his first league goal in a 3–0 home win against Sparti.

References

External links
Hasomeris in Panthrakikos
AEL 1964 FC Official
Sport Larissa
Woop.gr
Onsports.gr
Sportaction.gr

1989 births
Living people
Makedonikos F.C. players
Greek footballers
Iraklis Thessaloniki F.C. players
Association football forwards
Athlitiki Enosi Larissa F.C. players
Super League Greece players
Footballers from Komotini